Full Attention was the first studio album by the contemporary Christian musician Jeremy Riddle. It was produced by Bob Hartry and released on March 6, 2007, by Varietal Records. The album has had commercial chart successes and received critical acclaima from music critics. "God Moves in a Mysterious Way" was taken from a William Cowper poem titled "Light Shining Out of Darkness". Songwriting credit should not be given without noting this.

Music and lyrics
At Christianity Today, Christa Banister wrote that though he was "not necessarily reinventing the wheel here stylistically, Riddle handles modern worship as well as any — which should be more than enough to warrant your full attention." Ian Hayter of Cross Rhythms said that the "instrumentation is impressive and the singer's voice lends an air of real emotion to the set". At Alpha Omega News, Ken Weigman wrote that the album comes "with a state of the art production and skilled musicians, and you have one amazing project".

In terms of lyrics, Rachel Harrold for CCM Magazine wrote that the album has Riddle's "raw and passionate lyrics [which will] draw the listener into an atmosphere of worship". Banister wrote that "If solid lyrics weren't enough, the soundtrack provides plenty more to appreciate". Hayter wrote, "The songs bear the unmistakeable stamp of the Vineyard stable, with excellent guitar-based melodies and expertly produced arrangements forming the background for Riddle's articulate lyrics which draw you as the listener into his own personal spiritual space and then out again into full-blown worship of an awesome God." Weigman highlighted that "For the listener, this means passionate, moving lyrics and cut-to-the-heart vocals that can elevate you to a higher place of worship".

Critical reception

Full Attention received critical acclaim from music critics. At CCM Magazine, Rachel Harrold noted how the album was refreshing to hear because it contained music that was "aesthetically pleasing and spiritually uplifting". Ian Hayter of Cross Rhythms praised it as "an exceptional worship project". At Christianity Today, Christa Banister called the release "terrific". Jennifer E. Jones of Christian Broadcasting Network wrote that "There are moments during Full Attention where I worry that he may fall into the CCM trappings of heart-felt yet overused lyrics". At New Release Today, Kevin Davis felt that the release made Riddle "another candidate for best new artist in my opinion". Ken Weigman of Alpha Omega News thought that "for modern worship and AC, this CD is awesome".

Commercial performance
For the week of March 24, 2007, music charts by Billboard, Full Attention was the No. 43 most sold album on the breaking-and-entry chart via the Top Heatseekers placement, and was the No. 41 most sold Christian album.

Track listing

Personnel 
 Jeremy Riddle – vocals, acoustic guitar 
 Ben West – keyboards, organ, air organ, Mellotron, vibraphone, xylophone
 Bob Hartry – additional keyboards, Moog synthesizer, Mellotron, Optigan, melodica, programming, loops, acoustic guitar, electric guitars, handbells, vibraphone, xylophone, additional backing vocals 
 Kristopher Pooley – additional keyboards, Moog synthesizer, keyboards (7, 8), acoustic piano (7, 8)
 Jonathan Ahrens – bass guitar
 Aaron Sterling – drums, percussion
 Beth Balmer – cello, viola, violin 
 Jason Belt – backing vocals 
 Jennifer Belt – additional backing vocals 
 Matt Bissonette – additional backing vocals (4)
 Andy Arganda, Larry Hampton, Eric Hartry – additional harmony vocals (11)

Choir (tracks 3, 5 & 11)
 Lisa Bevill, Nirva Dorsaint-Ready, Bonnie Keen, Seth Ready and Terry White

Production 
 Casey Corum – executive producer 
 Bob Hartry – producer, engineer, recording 
 Paul Dexter – additional engineer 
 Eric Hartry – additional engineer 
 Colin Heldt – additional engineer
 Rich Renken – additional engineer, mix assistant (8)
 Ben West – additional engineer 
 Joe Zook – mixing (1, 11)
 Shane D. Wilson – mixing (2, 4, 5, 9, 10)
 Mark Drury – mix assistant (2, 4, 5, 9, 10)
 Sarah Deane – mix coordinator (2, 4, 5, 9, 10)
 Bob Clearmountain – mixing (3)
 Brandon Duncan – mix assistant (3)
 Tom Laune – mixing (6, 12)
 Chris Lord-Alge – mixing (7)
 Bryan Carlstrom – mixing (8)
 Gavin Lurssen – mastering 
 Adam Moseley – production coordinator, art direction 
 Joe Randeen – enhancement design 
 Pixel Peach Studio – package design, photography

Studios
 Recorded at Cat Beach (Los Angeles, California).
 Additional recording at Dark Horse Recording Studio (Franklin, Tennessee) and Smalltime Studios (Detroit, Michigan).
 Mixed at Pentavarit and Bridgeway Studios (Nashville, Tennessee); MixThis! (Los Angeles, California); Resonate Music and Eldo Studios (Burbank, California).
 Mastered at Lurssen Mastering (Hollywood, California).

Charts

References

2007 debut albums
Jeremy Riddle albums